Notodden Old Station was the railway station serving Notodden, Norway, from 1909 to 1919. The station was designed by Thorvald Astrup as the terminal station of Tinnoset Line. When Notodden was connected with the Bratsberg Line in 1919, Notodden New Station was built, and the old station fell into disuse. Today the station is used as a business park.

Railway stations on the Tinnoset Line
Railway stations in Notodden
Railway stations opened in 1909
Railway stations closed in 1919
Disused railway stations in Norway
1909 establishments in Norway
1919 disestablishments in Norway